Robin Brochon (born 21 September 2000) is a French professional rugby league footballer who plays as a  or er for the Toulouse Olympique in the RFL Championship.

Background
Brochon was born in Marmande, Lot-et-Garonne, France.

Career
In 2018 he made his Catalans Dragons debut in the Super League against the Warrington Wolves.

References

External links
Catalans Dragons profile

2000 births
Living people
AS Saint Estève players
Catalans Dragons players
French rugby league players
Rugby league wingers
Rugby league fullbacks
Toulouse Olympique players